The 1989 Rothmans Grand Prix was a professional ranking snooker tournament held at the Hexagon Theatre in Reading, England.

Steve Davis won in the final 10–0 against Dean Reynolds. This is the only whitewash final in the history of the tournament and only one of three whitewashes in any two-session final.

Main draw

Final

Century breaks

 141, 102  Willie Thorne
 138  Joe Johnson
 138  Jimmy White
 138  Gary Wilkinson
 136  Cliff Wilson
 134, 130, 129  Steve Davis
 130, 106  Stephen Hendry
 130  Tony Jones
 117, 103  Dean Reynolds
 115  Steve Meakin
 113, 103  Danny Fowler
 111  Mick Price
 110  Mike Hallett
 104  Dennis Taylor
 103  James Wattana
 102  Martin Clark

References

1989
Grand Prix
Grand Prix (snooker)
Grand Prix (snooker)